Gwys railway station served the village of Upper Cwmtwrch,  in the historical county of Brecknockshire, Wales, from 1868 to 1950 on the Swansea Vale Railway.

History 
The station was opened on 2 March 1868 by the Swansea Vale Railway. It closed on 25 September 1950.

References 

Disused railway stations in Powys
Railway stations in Great Britain opened in 1868
Railway stations in Great Britain closed in 1950
1868 establishments in Wales
1950 disestablishments in Wales